Tigreana is a genus, of moths, of the family Noctuidae. The genus was described by Bernard Laporte in 1991.

Species
Species from Africa:
Tigreana elodiae Laporte, 1991
Tigreana nathaliannae Laporte, 1991
Tigreana sandrae Laporte, 1991
Tigreana superba Laporte, 1991

References

Catocalinae